The Duchesne River Formation is a geologic formation in the Uintah Basin of northeastern Utah. It was originally named the Duchesne Formation  by Carnegie Museum paleontologist OA Peterson, and modified to the Duchesne River Formation by Carnegie Museum paleontologist JL Kay because Duschesne Formation was previously used for a Jurassic limestone. In naming the formation, no type section was given, only that it is named for the Duchesne River, which flows roughly southeast and east to join the Green River.

The formation consists of over 3000 feet (915 m) of fluvial conglomerate, sandstone and fine-grained sedimentary rocks. It is subdivided into four members (below), whose sediments are thought to have eroded from the rising Uinta Mountains to the north and deposited in river, floodplains and small lakes. Volcanic ash in the formation, derived from volcanoes in the Wasatch Range, East Tintic, and Oquirrh Mountains to west, have provided radiometric dates. These dates range from 38.2 +/-1.8 Ma for the Brennan Basin Member to 28.7 +/-2.0 Ma for the Lapoint Member.

Members and their Vertebrate Fossils

Brennan Basin Member: Named for Brennan Basin, Uintah County. Predominately sandstone that varies from yellow-gray to red brown, very fine, fine, medium, to coarse grained, thin to thick to very thick bedded, generally poorly sorted, and may be nodular, silty, pebbly, and cross stratified.  Minor beds of green-gray to red brown, silty to sandy, thin to very thin bedded, poorly sorted claystone, red brown, thin-bedded, nodular, poorly sorted mudstone, yellow brown, very thin bedded, nodular, poorly sorted, horizontally stratified siltstone, and red-purple, sandy, clayey, thin-bedded, medium to coarse crystalline limestone. Contains a diverse late Eocene vertebrate fauna.

Reptilia

CheloniaCymatholcus longus ClarkCrocodiliaCrocodilus? acer CopeMammalia

LagomorphaMytonolagus petersoni BurkeRodentiaLeptotomus kayi Burke

?Sciuravid or Myomorph sp.

Pareumys sp.

Protadjidaumo typus Burke

Mytonomys robustus (Peterson) WoodCarnivoraPleurocyon? or Uintacyon? sp.PerissodactylaProtitanotherium sp.

Dilophodon leotanus (Peterson) Hough

Epitriplopus medius Peterson

Mesamynodon medius Peterson

Megalamynodon regalis WoodArtiodactylaPentacemylus progressus Peterson

Diplobunops crassus Scott

Protoreodon pumilus annectens (Marsh) Gazin

Protoreodon primus (Peterson) Gazin

?Hypertragulid sp.Dry Gulch Creek Member: Named for Dry CGulch Creek, Uintah County. Consists of pale red, olive gray to yellow brown, coarse, medium, fine to very fine grained, thin-, thick to very thick bedded, massive, moderately to poorly sorted sandstone that may be horizontally or cross stratified and red, gray to brown, very thin, thin- to thick-bedded, moderately to poorly sorted claystone that may be nodular, micaceous, or laminated.  Contains plant remains and a sparse vertebrate fauna.

Mammalia

CarnivoraEosictis avinoffi ScottPerissodactylaEpihippus (Duchesnehippus) intermedius PetersonLapoint Member: Named for the town of Lapoint, Uintah County. Composed of olive, green-gray, dark gray, very thin to thin bedded, nodular, poorly sorted, horizontally stratified, laminated claystone; light gray, light brown, gray orange to red brown, thin-bedded, slabby, horizontally stratified, poorly sorted, medium-grained, to thick-bedded, blocky, poorly sorted, coarse-grained sandstone; gray-red to red-brown, thin-bedded, nodular, horizontally stratified, poorly sorted siltstone; and gray-orange, very thick bedded, massive, poorly sorted pebble conglomerate. Abundant late Eocene vertebrates.

Reptilia

CrocodiliaCrocodilus? acer CopeMammalia

InsectivoraProtictops alticuspidens PetersonRodentiaLeptotomus kayi Burke

Pareumys guensburgi Black

Protadjidaumo typus Burke

CreodontaHyaenodon sp.

MesonychiaHessolestes ultimus Peterson

PerissodactylaTeleodus uintensis Peterson

Epitriplopus medius Peterson

Hyracodon primus Peterson

Mesamynodon medius PetersonArtiodactylaPentacemylus progressus Peterson

Helohyus(?) sp.

Poabromylus kayi Peterson

Simimeryx minutus (Peterson) GazinStarr Flat:  Named for John Starr Flat, Duchesne County. Consists of: 1) red- to yellow-brown, light gray, gray- to yellow-orange, pale red to gray red sandstone that ranges from coarse, medium, fine to very fine grained, thin, thick to very thick bedded, sandy, silty, to clayey, cross-stratified to horizontally stratified, flaggy, blocky, massive, brown-gray, gray-red to olive, sandy to silty; 2) very thin bedded, poorly sorted, platy, laminated, nodular to massive claystone; and 3) gray red, sandy, poorly sorted, thin-bedded, nodular, massive siltstone.  Sandstone may also be poorly sorted, pebbly, nodular and massive.  No fossils found.

See also

 List of fossiliferous stratigraphic units in Utah
 Paleontology in Utah

References
 

Paleogene geology of Utah